Franklinton Depot, also known as the Raleigh and Gaston Railroad Passenger Depot and Franklinton Woman's Club Clubhouse, is a historic train station located at 201 East Mason Street in Franklinton, Franklin County, North Carolina.  It was built by the Raleigh and Gaston Railroad in 1886, and is a one-story, rectangular frame building with Italianate, Queen Anne, and Gothic Revival style design elements.  The main section measures 51 feet by 16 feet, with an attached 10 feet by 12 feet baggage room.  The main section has a steeply pitched gable roof and baggage room a low-pitched hip roof. It served the Seaboard Air Line's Palmland (New York - St. Petersburg and Miami) as well as local service between Norlina and Hamlet.

It was moved to its present location in 1973 when acquired by the Franklinton Woman's Club as a clubhouse.

It was listed on the National Register of Historic Places in 1990.

References

Railway stations on the National Register of Historic Places in North Carolina
Gothic Revival architecture in North Carolina
Italianate architecture in North Carolina
Queen Anne architecture in North Carolina
Railway stations in the United States opened in 1886
National Register of Historic Places in Franklin County, North Carolina
Seaboard Air Line Railroad stations
Former railway stations in North Carolina